Yu Long (pinyin: Yú Lóng; born July 1, 1964) is a Chinese conductor.  He is currently artistic director and chief conductor of the China Philharmonic and of the Shanghai Symphony Orchestra, music director of the Guangzhou Symphony Orchestra, and principal guest conductor of the Hong Kong Philharmonic Orchestra. Yu is also the Chairman of the Artistic Committee of the Beijing Music Festival and co-director of the Music in the Summer Air Festival (MISA).

Biography
The son of a pianist mother Ding Jiannuo and a choreographer father Yu Lixun Yu was born into a family of musicians in Shanghai, China and grew up during the Cultural Revolution.  Yu received his early childhood music education beginning with piano studies from his grandfather, the composer Ding Shande.  He continued his piano studies at the Shanghai Conservatory of Music, and also began conducting studies, graduating from the conservatory in 1987.  He further studied music in Europe at the Berlin University of the Arts.

After returning from Europe, Yu was appointed principal conductor of the Central Opera Theatre in Beijing in 1992, serving for three years.  He produced operas for the Urban Council of Hong Kong for five years.  He was a founder of the Beijing Music Festival (BMF) in 1998, becoming its first artistic director.

In 2000, the Chinese government invited Yu to assume leadership of the China Broadcasting Symphony (also called the China National Symphony). Yu held open auditions, becoming the first Chinese orchestra to recruit all its performers this way. The symphony was renamed the China Philharmonic Orchestra. In 2008, Yu and the China Philharmonic performed for Pope Benedict XVI at the Vatican, as part of increased diplomatic initiative between China and the Vatican.  In July 2014, the China Philharmonic was the first Chinese orchestra to perform at the BBC Proms.

In 2003, the Guangzhou Symphony Orchestra appointed Yu its music director.  In 2009, the Shanghai Symphony Orchestra appointed Yu its music director.  During his tenure, the orchestra has begun its Music in the Summer Air Festival (MISA) in August 2010, constructed a new home for the orchestra (the Shanghai Symphony Hall) in 2014, established the Shanghai Orchestra Academy in 2014, and begun the Shanghai Isaac Stern International Violin Competition in 2016.  Yu has shared the position of Artistic Co-Director of the Music In the Summer Air Festival (MISA) with Charles Dutoit since the festival's launch in 2010.  In January 2015, Yu was named principal guest conductor of the Hong Kong Philharmonic Orchestra, the first appointment of a mainland Chinese conductor to the position.

In June 2018, Deutsche Grammophon announced an exclusive recording deal with Yu and Shanghai Symphony Orchestra (SSO).

Select discography

Honors and awards
 2002: Arts Patronage Award of the Montblanc Cultural Foundation
 2003: Chevalier dans L’Ordre des Arts et des Lettres, France
 2005: L'onorificenza di commendatore, Italy
 December 2014: Chevalier de la Légion d’Honneur, France
 October 2015: Atlantic Council Global Citizen Award
 April 2016: Foreign Honorary Member of the American Academy of Arts & Sciences
 June 2016: Order of Merit of the Federal Republic of Germany

References

External links

Askonas Holt management biography of Long Yu
Compose 20:20 Project
Shanghai Symphony Orchestra Chinese-language biography of Long Yu
Guangzhou Symphony biography of Long Yu
Music in the Summer Air page on Long Yu

1964 births
Living people
Chinese conductors (music)
Musicians from Shanghai
Shanghai Conservatory of Music alumni
Chevaliers of the Ordre des Arts et des Lettres
Chevaliers of the Légion d'honneur
Recipients of the Legion of Honour
Fellows of the American Academy of Arts and Sciences
Recipients of the Order of Merit of the Federal Republic of Germany
21st-century conductors (music)
Chinese musicians
Chinese art directors